Geoff Davey (3 September 1945 – 4 June 1967) was an  Australian rules footballer who played with South Melbourne in the Victorian Football League (VFL).

Notes

External links 

1945 births
1967 deaths
Australian rules footballers from Victoria (Australia)
Sydney Swans players